OGLE-TR-211b is a transiting planet in Carina constellation. Its radius is about 36% more than Jupiter and has mass 3% more than Jupiter, which is considered an “inflated Hot Jupiter”. The planet takes 3.7 days at about the same distance as 51 Pegasi b orbits around 51 Pegasi.

See also 
 OGLE-TR-182b
 Optical Gravitational Lensing Experiment OGLE

References

External links 

 

Hot Jupiters
Transiting exoplanets
Exoplanets discovered in 2007
Giant planets
Carina (constellation)